The Southport Tournament was a professional golf tournament played in the Southport area in North West England. It was founded in 1930 when it was sponsored by a Manchester newspaper, the Daily Dispatch. From 1931 it was sponsored by Dunlop and was known as the Dunlop-Southport Tournament, being jointly funded by Southport Corporation. The last event was played in 1948 when Southport Corporation withdrew their funding. It was replaced by the "Dunlop Tournament", played at various location in the United Kingdom. The tournament was played in May and was played over 72 holes of stroke play. Qualifying, over 36 holes, took place at local courses immediately before the tournament.

Henry Cotton dominated the first six events, winning twice and being runner-up in the other four.

The 1939 event was cancelled because of difficulties finding suitable courses for qualifying and the event itself.

Winners

References

Golf tournaments in England